Amt Brieskow-Finkenheerd is an Amt ("collective municipality") in the district of Oder-Spree, in Brandenburg, Germany. Its seat is in Brieskow-Finkenheerd.

The Amt Brieskow-Finkenheerd consists of the following municipalities:
Brieskow-Finkenheerd
Groß Lindow
Vogelsang
Wiesenau
Ziltendorf

Demography 

Brieskow
Oder-Spree